Pam Jochum (born September 26, 1954) is an American politician serving as the Iowa State Senator from the 35th District and former President of the Iowa Senate. A Democrat, she was a member of the Iowa House of Representatives from 1993 to 2009, when she became a member of the Iowa Senate.

Jochum serves on several committees in the Iowa Senate - the Appropriations committee; the Judiciary committee; the Rebuild Iowa committee; the State Government committee; the Ways and Means committee; and she is vice chair of the Labor and Business Relations committee; Rules & Administration and state committees. She also serves as vice chair of the Administration and Regulation Appropriations Subcommittee. Her prior political experience includes serving as floor whip at the Democratic National Convention in 1984, serving as chair of the Dubuque County Democratic Central Committee in 1982.

Jochum was elected to the Senate in 2008 with 19,443 votes, defeating Republican opponent John Hulsizer, Jr.

Education
Jochum graduated from Wahlert High School and she received her A.A. and B.A. degrees from Loras College.

Career
Prior to working in politics, Jochum worked at Loras College.

Organizations
League of Woman Voters
Greater Dubuque Development Corporation
Prevention of Disabilities
Task Force to Prevent Family Violence

References

External links
Senator Pam Jochum official Iowa Legislature site
Senator Pam Jochum official Iowa General Assembly site
 

|-

|-

|-

|-

1954 births
21st-century American politicians
21st-century American women politicians
Living people
Loras College alumni
Democratic Party members of the Iowa House of Representatives
Politicians from Dubuque, Iowa
Presidents of the Iowa Senate
Democratic Party Iowa state senators
Women state legislators in Iowa